To be sinful is to have committed an act that violates a known religious rule.

Sinful may also refer to:

 Sinful (album), a 1979 hard rock album
 Sinful (film), a 1965 Mexican film
 Sinful (album), the 1987 debut solo album by Pete Wylie
 "Sinful" (song), the album's title track and Wylie's debut solo single

See also

 Sin (disambiguation)
 Sinner (disambiguation)
 Sinners (disambiguation)